Roughness length is a parameter of some vertical wind profile equations that model the horizontal mean wind speed near the ground. In the log wind profile, it is equivalent to the height at which the wind speed theoretically becomes zero in the absence of wind-slowing obstacles and under neutral conditions. In reality, the wind at this height no longer follows a mathematical logarithm. It is so named because it is typically related to the height of terrain roughness elements (i.e. protrusions from and/or depressions into the surface). For instance, forests tend to have much larger roughness lengths than tundra. The roughness length does not exactly correspond to any physical length. However, it can be considered as a length-scale representation of the roughness of the surface.

Mathematical foundation
The roughness length  appears in the expression for the mean wind speed  near the ground derived using the Monin–Obukhov similarity theory:

where
 is the friction velocity
 is the Von Kármán constant
 is the elevation (as measured from the ground)
 is the elevation of the displacement plane (as measured from the ground), which is an offset that accounts for wind-slowing obstacles such as buildings, trees, or any other structures which impede flow
 is the Monin-Obukhov length (which is defined to be the height at which buoyancy and wind shear are equally effective at creating turbulence)
 is a correction factor for stability, with  indicating statically neutral conditions. Conditions are statically neutral when the temperature of the air monotonically increases with elevation.
In the simplest possible case (statically neutral conditions and no wind-slowing obstacles), the mean wind speed simplifies to:

This provides a method to calculate the roughness length by measuring the friction velocity and the mean wind velocity (at known elevation) in a given, relatively flat location (under neutral conditions) using an anemometer. Of note is that, in this simplified form, the log wind profile is identical in form to the dimensional law of the wall.

If we don't know the friction velocity, one can calculate the surface roughness as follow

Due to the limitation of observation instruments and the theory of mean values, the levels (z) should be chosen where there is enough difference between the measurement readings.  If one has more than two readings, the measurements can be fit to the above equation to find the roughness length.
When calculating the surface roughness, the displacement height can be neglected.

Application
As an approximation, the roughness length is approximately one-tenth of the height of the surface roughness elements. For example, short grass of height 0.01 meters has a roughness length of approximately 0.001 meters. Surfaces are rougher if they have more protrusions. Forests have much larger roughness lengths than tundra, for example. Roughness length is an important concept in urban meteorology as the building of tall structures, such as skyscrapers, has an effect on roughness length and wind patterns.

Relation to other roughness measures

The roughness length is one of many possible measures of the roughness of a surface. For example, in classical mechanics the coefficient of friction is commonly used to measure the roughness of a surface as it relates to the force exerted on another contacted object. And, in fluid dynamics, hydraulic roughness is a measure of the resistance water experiences when flowing over land or through a channel. All of these measures ultimately derive from frictional forces, which result from irregularities on the surfaces of relevance.

References

External links
 Aerodynamic Roughness (Length AMS Glossary)
 Surface Roughness Length
 Roughness
 Roughness (AMS Glossary)

See also
Von Kármán constant
Monin-Obukhov length
Wind profile power laws

Atmospheric dispersion modeling
Fluid dynamics
Boundary layer meteorology